Elizabeth Bennett-Parker is an American politician. A Democrat, she is a member of the Virginia House of Delegates, representing the 45th district since 2022.

Biography
Bennett-Parker served on the Alexandria City Council from 2018 to 2021 and was Vice Mayor of Alexandria from 2019 to 2021. She is active in several local and regional organizations and helped lead Together We Bake, a non-profit job training and personal development program.

Political career

2021
Bennett-Parker ran in the 2021 election, and in the primary defeated incumbent delegate Mark Levine, who was simultaneously running for lieutenant governor, with 59.24% of the vote. In the general election she defeated Republican J.D. Maddox with 73.68% of the vote.

References

Democratic Party members of the Virginia House of Delegates
Women state legislators in Virginia
Year of birth missing (living people)
Living people
Politicians from Alexandria, Virginia